Deh Now (also Romanized as Deh-i-Nau) is a village in Meshkan Rural District, Meshkan District, Khoshab County, Razavi Khorasan Province, Iran. At the 2006 census, its population was 148, in 34 families.

References 

Populated places in Khoshab County